The Bennett Hiatt Log House, near Renfro Valley, Kentucky, is a log house built in 1828.   It was listed on the National Register of Historic Places in 1984.

The house was built originally as a one-and-a-half-story single pen;  an extension was added after the Civil War.  There are six contributing buildings on the property.

References

Log houses in the United States
Houses on the National Register of Historic Places in Kentucky
Houses completed in 1828
National Register of Historic Places in Rockcastle County, Kentucky
1828 establishments in Kentucky
Log buildings and structures on the National Register of Historic Places in Kentucky
Single pen architecture